Ephalaenia is a genus of moths in the family Geometridae described by Wehrli in 1936.

Species
Ephalaenia variaria Leech, 1897
Ephalaenia xylina Wehrli, 1936

References

Ennominae